Vallop Potaya (born 1 April 1942) is a Thai archer. He competed in the men's individual event at the 1976 Summer Olympics.

References

1942 births
Living people
Vallop Potaya
Vallop Potaya
Archers at the 1976 Summer Olympics
Place of birth missing (living people)